Niniva is an island in Lifuka district, in the Haʻapai islands of Tonga. The island is 26m high.

References

Islands of Tonga
Haʻapai